Sandleford is a hamlet and former parish in the English county of Berkshire.

Landscape
Sandleford contains about 520 acres, most of which is taken up with the fields and copses to the west of the Priory.

Population
A census taken in 1801 showed Sandleford to have three houses, three families and 18 people. At the same time Newbury comprised 931 houses, 34 empty houses, 971 families and 4275 people. John Marius Wilson in his Imperial Gazetteer of England and Wales, 1870–72, gave Sandleford as having Real property £775; of which £10 are in fisheries, and a population of 49 in nine houses, but in 1881 the population of Sandleford had shrunk to 34. In 1615 it was separated from the manor and parish of Newbury, and the adjacent Wash Common and became extra-parochial, as described by Sir Francis More, Kt, of Fawley, it was to be: no part of the Parish of Newbury, nor to be so reputed.

On 23 August 1759 the Rector of Newbury, Rev. Thomas Penrose (died 1769), father of the poet Thomas Penrose, in answer to some set questions about Newbury, and to question number five in particular which concerned 'seats of gentry' in the town, wrote this: [Newbury has] No seat of gentry; if you except Sandleford, which is an estate held of the church of Windsor, and which is often considered as extra-parochial, but which pays a composition in lieu of tithes to the rector of Newbury. It is situated to the south of Newbury. The present lessee is Edward Montagu, Esq.; Member of Parliament for the town of Huntingdon.

Civil War

The Victorian historian, Walter Money, believed that, at the start of the First Battle of Newbury in September 1643, Prince Rupert of the Rhine lined up his cavalry at the western end of Sandleford estate, straddling the boundary with Wash Common and looking towards Enborne, although this is now disputed. After the battle, the line of march pursued by Robert Devereux, 3rd Earl of Essex back to Reading, was from the Wash, by Sandleford, over Greenham Common and via Theale. Anthony Child, Mayor of Newbury 1614, and sometime leasee of Sandleford;

Notable buildings

Sandleford Priory

Monastery

Inclusa of Sandraford, as mentioned in a pipe roll of 26 Henry II, 1179–80. Otherwise known as an anchoress, a female Anchorite, a withdrawn holy person;

Sandleford was a priory of Austin canons, founded between 1193 and 1202 by Geoffrey, 4th count of Perch, and Richenza-Matilda his wife. A confirmation charter from Archbishop Stephen indicates the priory was dedicated to St John the Baptist and endowed with all the lands of Sandleford. The appropriation of the priory, on 9 March 1478, to the Dean and Canons of Windsor was mainly owing to Bishop Beauchamp of Salisbury, who was Dean of Windsor from 1478 to 1481. By this time it appears the religious had forsaken the priory. The chapel of Sandleford Priory (1200–1478) was incorporated into a later country house.

Country house

It was erected around the old priory buildings between 1780 and 1786 by James Wyatt, for Elizabeth Montagu, the social reformer, patron of the arts, salonist, literary critic and writer who helped organise and lead the Blue Stockings Society. It was later inherited by her nephew, Matthew Montagu, 4th Baron Rokeby. Her friend Hannah More was there often and described it in 1784. Other wealthy citizens that it was leased to during the 17th, 18th and 19th centuries, these included:

John and Henry Kingsmill, from c. 1685 and 1706 and 1710, until circa 1715–1717. John Kingsmill, JP (Newbury, 1685) was a younger son of Sir Henry Kingsmill (1587–1625), and husband to Rachael daughter of JP and sometime MP Edward Pitt (c.1592–1643), of Steepleton Iwerne, Dorset and later of Stratfield Saye (which he bought for £4,800 in 1629), by Rachael (d. 1643) daughter of Sir George Morton, Bart., son of Sir William Pitt, kt. 1618, Comptroller of the Household. Their sons Robert and Henry Kingsmill died without issue in 1697 and 1710.  George Pitt the brother of Rachel Pitt, Mrs John Kingsmill, married Jane, the daughter of John Savage, 2nd Earl Rivers;A treatise enumerating the most illustrious families of England, who have been raised to honour and wealth by the profession of law together with the ... court, and barons of the Exchequer, Fleet Street, London, 1686.</ref> Anne Finch, Countess of Winchilsea, daughter of Sir William Kingsmill of Sydmonton Court, was a niece and first cousin.
William Cradock (died 1736), of Gainford Hall, Gainsford, Durham. He married in 1715 Mary daughter of Gilbert Sheldon of St. Andrew's, Holborn, and bought the lease in 1717, disposing of it in 1729;
Edward Montagu, grandson of Edward Montagu, 1st Earl of Sandwich, leaseholder from 1730, married Elizabeth Robinson in 1742. Sandleford had been in possession of the first cousin (Rachael Pitt, Mrs John Kingsmill) of his first cousin (Sir Edward Wortley-Montagu (1678 –1761), the father of Lady Mary Wortley Montagu);
Matthew Montagu (1762–1831), MP, 4th Baron Rokeby;
Edward Montagu, the 5th Baron Rokeby, who parted with the lease in 1835, to William Chatteris, and died in 1847;
William Pollet Brown Chatteris (1810–1889), JP, DL (1852, Berks), educated at Brasenose College, Oxford, and son of a London banker, who eventually bought the freehold, enfranchised the estate, in 1875 from the Dean and Canons of Windsor. His first wife (married 1833) was Anne eldest daughter of Alexander Arbuthnot, Bishop of Killaloe;
Chatteris' nephew Alpin Macgregor (died 1899) son of Sir John Atholl Macgregor, bart., nephew of Chatteris' second wife, daughter of Admiral Sir Thomas Masterman Hardy;
Macgregor's niece Miss Agatha Thynne (died 1962), (descended from Thomas Thynne, 2nd Marquess of Bath), wife of the 3rd Baron Hindlip. Her mother (died 1934) and father John Charles Thynne (1838–1918), sometime receiver general to the Dean and Chapter of Westminster, were living at Sandleford Cottage in 1907. Her sister Joan E. M. (1872–1945) was the mother of John Campbell, 5th Earl Cawdor.
Mrs. Myers, aka Evelyn Elizabeth Myers, who wrote A History of Sandleford Priory, with plates, Newbury District Field Club, Special Publication. no. 1, published between 1900 and 1931, was tenant from before 1898 to at least 1911.
Major Aubrey Isaac Rothwell Butler, (1878-27.9.1930), son of Isaac Butler (1839–1917), JP (Sheriff of Monmouth 1910), of Panteg House, Griffithstown, Torfaen, near Newport. It is claimed that the first sheet steel in Britain was rolled in Staffordshire in 1876 from a bloom made in Panteg by Isaac Butler. Aubrey Butler was sometime manager of Baldwin's Ltd branches in Monmouth & Midlands, Baldwins having taken over the family firm, Wright, Butler and Co Ltd, in 1902. Later he was Sheriff of Monmouthshire, 1924, and by the time of his early death was described as formerly of Sandleford Priory and of 13, Porchester Terrace, London.

The house is now home to St Gabriel's School.

Sandleford Place
This house, formerly known has both Sandleford Cottage and Sandleford Lodge, sits on the southern boundary of the old parish, by the River Enborne, on the Berkshire and Hampshire, and Sandleford and Newtown border. Its former residents have included:

John Deane, from circa 1624;
Mrs Colman;
Henry Hart Millman, divine, whose wife Mary Anne was a daughter of Lt-general William Cockell (died 1831) of Sandleford Lodge;
Robert Fellowes (1817–1915), of Shotesham, and his sister Louisa Fellowes (1817–1901), were both born at Sandleford Cottage, the seat of their father Robert (1779–1869). Later she married Sir Thomas Gladstone, Bt. (and thus sister-in-law of William Gladstone the Prime Minister). Children of Robert Fellowes (1779–1869) by his second wife Jane Louisa Sheldon, daughter of the MP for Wilton (1804–1822) Colonel Ralph Sheldon (1741–1822), of Donnington Cottage, near Newbury, Berkshire, and grandchildren of Robert Fellowes (1742–1829), of Shotesham, MP for Norwich. Their younger sister was Baroness Sandhurst (1827–1892), a philanthropist and suffagist. Robert Fellowes is a direct ancestor of Sir Robert Fellowes, aka Lord Fellowes.

The 1861 census lists at Sandleford Lodge, Lady Louisa Anne Magenis (1837–1918), daughter of Armar Lowry-Corry, 3rd Earl Belmore, and her husband (they married in 1860) Major Richard Henry Magenis (Mauritius, 1832 – Abington, 1880). Magenis was the grandson of Colonel Richard Magenis (married 1788) by his wife Lady Elizabeth-Anne Cole (1765–1807 or 1808), daughter of William Cole, 1st Earl of Enniskillen and sister of General Sir Galbraith Lowry Cole, GCB, KCB, Governor of Mauritius 1823–1828.  Richard Henry Magenis was J.P. for Counties Antrim and Cambridgeshire, High Sheriff of Antrim 1868, and Representative of the Viscounts Magenis (attainted 1691), with later addresses at Abington Hall, Cambridge; and Finvoy Lodge, Co. Antrim.

William Frederick Hicks-Beach (1841–1923), MP, was living at Sandleford lodge in 1869 and by 1871 he is recorded as having with him a wife and four children, and eight staff.
Mrs. Wedderburn (1825–), aka Selina Mary Garth, daughter of Captain Thomas Garth, RN, of Haines Hill, Hurst, Berkshire, and widow of Frederick Lewis Scrymgeour-Wedderburn (1808–1874), de jure 8th Earl of Dundee, and her daughters Charlotte and Selina Elgiva, (1856–), were living at Sandleford Lodge, c. 1881 and 1883;
Brigadier Wyndham Torr, CMG, DSO, MC, (1890–1963) of Sandleford Place; soldier in WW1; military attache Madrid, Lisbon, Washington, Spain, etc.; 
Seton Montolieu Montgomerie (1846–1883), and his wife Mrs. Montgomerie, aka Nina Janet Bronwen Peers Williams (daughter of Thomas Peers Williams, MP), of Sandleford cottage (later renamed place), and their daughters Viva and Alswen.

Sandleford Grove
James Asprey, Esq., maltster, (Highclere, 1811–1893), of Sandleford Grove, exhibited white trump wheat grown on very poor soil, weight 67 Lbs per bushel, at the Great Exhibition of 1851;

Sandleford Farm
King James I, was leased Sandleford farm by the Dean and Canons of Windsor, January 1605.<ref>Calendar of State Papers, January 1605, published 1857, page 186. 'Letter to the Dean & Canons of Windsor, to make a lease to the King of the farm of Sandleford, Wiltshire [sic], a docquet, a Scots word for docket.</ref> The other present owners and directors of Sandleford Farm partnership and Skilldraw Ltd include Nicholas Laing (c. 15%), of the family that made McVitie's, and father of TV's Made in Chelsea star Jamie Laing; Delia Norgate, widow of the founder of Trencherwood Homes, John Norgate; and Noel Gibbs a descendant of William Gibbs of Tyntesfield, and of Sir Frederick Wills, 1st Baronet.Burke's Peerage

Literature
Mrs. Elizabeth Montagu, the distinguished blue-stocking, who lived at Sandleford Priory from 1742 until her death in 1800 wrote from and mentioned Sandleford in dozens of her of letters.

The original home of the rabbits in Richard Adams' novel Watership Down was at Sandleford.

Landowners
At time of the Domesday survey in 1086 Sandleford seems to have been a part of or belonged with Ulvitrone, aka Newbury, to Arnulf or Ernulf de Hesdin (1038-killed Antioch, 1097/98), son of Gerard IV of Hesdin by his wife Nesta ferch Gruffydd, a daughter of Gruffydd ap Llywelyn by Ealdgyth, daughter of Earl Ælfgar. Newbury was assessed to have had pannage for 50 hogs, much of this woodland will have been the wood called Brademore (Broadmoor) at Sandleford.

Richard Pinfold, one of 30 of the freeholders of Newbury in 1655, and sometime holder of the lease of the coppice named High Wood; John Kendrick, Warren farm which abuts the estate to the west was purchased for £250, out of the £4000 which Kendrick left Newbury in 1624. In addition the Kendrick charity had two closes on the west side of Newtown lane leased from the Dean & Canons, for 10l 10s per annum. Levi Smith (died 1703), Mayor of Newbury 1674 and 1693. Owned land in Greenham and along the Enborne at Peckmore in Greenham that abutted Sandleford and was later part of its demesne.

On 30 September 1986, the circa 470 acre Sandleford Farm, was sold by Neate's, with help from Knight Frank & Rutley, at the Chequers Hotel, Newbury, for over two million pounds.
In the meantime the 1972 writings of Richard Adams in chapter one of Watership Down'' regarding the borders of Wash Common and Sandleford (what Adams calls Sandleford Common) seem rather prescient concerning the ambitious and imminent housing plans that have since abounded.

Suddenly Fiver shivered and cowered down.
'Oh, Hazel! This is where it comes from! I know now –
something very bad! Some terrible thing – coming closer
and closer'.
He began to whimper with fear. 
'What sort of thing-what do you mean?I thought you
said there was no danger?'
'I don't know what it is,' answered Fiver wretchedly.
'There isn't any danger here at this moment. But it's
coming – it's coming. Oh, Hazel, look! The field! It's
covered with blood!'
...
'Back to the burrow?' whimpered Fiver. 'It'll come
there – don't think it won't! I tell you, the field's full of
blood -'...
... ...
THIS IDEALLY SITUATED ESTATE, COM-
PRISING SIX ACRES OF EXCELLENT
BUILDING LAND, IS TO BE DEVELOPED
WITH HIGH CLASS MODERN RESIDENCES
BY SUTCH AND MARTIN, LIMITED, OF 
NEWBURY, BERKS.

References

Hamlets in Berkshire
West Berkshire District
Former civil parishes in Berkshire